An electric bicycle (e-bike, eBike, etc.) is a motorized bicycle with an integrated electric motor used to assist propulsion. Many kinds of e-bikes are available worldwide, but they generally fall into two broad categories: bikes that assist the rider's pedal-power (i.e. pedelecs) and bikes that add a throttle, integrating moped-style functionality. Both retain the ability to be pedaled by the rider and are therefore not electric motorcycles.

E-bike use is growing in some markets, as they are seen as an eco-friendly and healthy alternative to cars, fossil fuel-powered mopeds and small motorcycles, and a less physically intense alternative to conventional bicycles.

Depending on local laws, many e-bikes (e.g., pedelecs) are legally classified as bicycles rather than mopeds or motorcycles. This exempts them from the more stringent laws regarding the certification and operation of more powerful two-wheelers which are often classed as electric motorcycles, such as licensing and mandatory safety equipment. E-bikes can also be defined separately and treated under distinct electric bicycle laws. In UK legislation the vehicles are called electrically assisted pedal cycles (EAPC), in EU legislation electrically power assisted cycles (EPAC).

History

In the 1890s, electric bicycles were documented within various U.S. patents. For example, on 31 December 1895, Ogden Bolton Jr. was granted  for a battery-powered bicycle with "6-pole brush-and-commutator direct current (DC) hub motor mounted in the rear wheel". There were no gears and the motor could draw up to 100 amperes from a 10-volt battery.

Two years later, in 1897, Hosea W. Libbey of Boston invented an electric bicycle that was propelled by a "double electric motor". The motor was designed within the hub of the crankset axle. This model was later re-invented and imitated in the late 1990s by Giant Lafree e-bikes.

By 1898 a rear-wheel drive electric bicycle, which used a driving belt along the outside edge of the wheel, was patented by Mathew J. Steffens. Also, the 1899  by John Schnepf depicted a rear-wheel friction "roller-wheel" style drive electric bicycle. Schnepf's invention was later re-examined and expanded in 1969 by G. A. Wood Jr. with his . Wood's device used four fractional horsepower motors connected through a series of gears.

Torque sensors and power controls were developed in the late 1990s. For example, Takada Yutky of Japan filed a patent in 1997 for such a device. In 1992 Vector Services Limited offered and sold an e-bike dubbed Zike. The bicycle included NiCd batteries that were built into a frame member and included an 850 g permanent-magnet motor. Despite the Zike, in 1992 hardly any commercial e-bikes were available.

Yamaha, a Japanese automotive giant built one of the early prototypes of e-bike back in 1989 and invented the pedal assist system in 1993.

Production grew from 1993 to 2004 by an estimated 35%. By contrast, according to Gartner, in 1995 regular bicycle production decreased from its peak 107 million units.

American car executive Lee Iacocca founded EV Global Motors in 1997, a company that produced an electric bicycle model named E-bike SX, and it was one of the early efforts to popularize e-bikes in the United States.

Some of the less expensive e-bikes used bulky lead-acid batteries, whereas newer models generally used NiMH, NiCd, and/or Li-ion batteries, which offered lighter, denser capacity batteries. Performance varies; however, in general there is an increase in range and speed with the latter battery types.

By 2001 the terms e-bike, power bike, "pedelec", pedal-assisted, and power-assisted bicycle were commonly used to refer to e-bikes.

In a parallel hybrid motorized bicycle, such as the aforementioned 1897 invention by Hosea W. Libbey, human and motor inputs are mechanically coupled either in the bottom bracket, the rear wheel, or the front wheel, whereas in a (mechanical) series hybrid cycle, the human and motor inputs are coupled through differential gearing. In an (electronic) series hybrid cycle, human power is converted into electricity and is fed directly into the motor and mostly additional electricity is supplied from a battery.

By 2007 e-bikes were thought to make up 10 to 20 percent of all two-wheeled vehicles on the streets of many major Chinese cities.

Gallery

Classes 

E-bikes are classed according to the power that their electric motor can deliver and the control system, i.e., when and how the power from the motor is applied. Also the classification of e-bikes is complicated as much of the definition is due to legal reasons of what constitutes a bicycle and what constitutes a moped or motorcycle. As such, the classification of these e-bikes varies greatly across countries and local jurisdictions.

Despite these legal complications, the classification of e-bikes is mainly decided by whether the e-bike's motor assists the rider using a pedal-assist system or by a power-on-demand one. Definitions of these are as follows:
With pedal-assist, the electric motor is regulated by pedalling. The pedal-assist augments the efforts of the rider when they are pedalling. These e-bikes – called pedelecs – have a sensor to detect the pedalling speed, the pedalling force, or both. Brake activation is sensed to disable the motor as well.
With power-on-demand, the motor is activated by a throttle, usually handlebar-mounted just like on most motorcycles or scooters.

Therefore, very broadly, e-bikes can be classed as:
 E-bikes with pedal-assist only: either pedelecs (legally classed as bicycles) or S-Pedelecs  (often legally classed as mopeds)
 E-bikes with power-on-demand and pedal-assist
 E-bikes with power-on-demand only: often have more powerful motors than pedelecs but not always, the more powerful of these are legally classed as mopeds or motorcycles

Pedal-assist only 
E-bikes with pedal-assist only are usually called pedelecs but can be broadly classified into pedelecs proper and the more powerful S-Pedelecs.

Pedelecs 

The term "pedelec" (from pedal electric cycle) refers to a pedal-assist e-bike with a relatively low-powered electric motor and a decent but not excessive top speed. Pedelecs are legally classed as bicycles rather than low-powered motorcycles or mopeds.

The most influential definition of pedelecs comes from the EU. EU directive (EN15194 standard) for motor vehicles considers a bicycle to be a pedelec if:
 The pedal-assist, i.e. the motorised assistance that only engages when the rider is pedalling, cuts out once
  is reached, and
An e-bike conforming to these conditions is considered to be a pedelec in the EU and is legally classed as a bicycle. The EN15194 standard is valid across the whole of the EU and has also been adopted by some non-EU European nations and also some non-European jurisdictions (such as the state of Victoria in Australia).

Pedelecs are much like conventional bicycles in use and function—the electric motor only provides assistance, for example, when the rider is climbing or struggling against a headwind. Pedelecs are therefore especially useful for people in hilly areas where riding a bike would prove too strenuous for many to consider taking up cycling as a daily means of transport. They are also useful for riders who more generally need some assistance, e.g. for people with heart, leg muscle or knee joint issues.

S-Pedelecs 
More powerful pedelecs which are not legally classed as bicycles are dubbed S-Pedelecs (short for Schnell-Pedelecs, i.e. Speedy-Pedelecs) in Germany. S-Pedelec class e-bikes are therefore usually classified as mopeds or motorcycles rather than as bicycles and therefore may (depending on the jurisdiction) need to be registered and insured, the rider may need some sort of driver's license (either car or motorcycle) and motorcycle helmets may have to be worn. In the United States, many states have adopted S-Pedelecs into the Class 3 category.

Power-on-demand and pedal-assist 
Some newer electric bikes include a pedal assist system (PAS) with or without throttle, allowing riders to pedal alongside the electric motor to increase distance per charge. There are also electric bike conversion kits for turning non-electric bikes into e-bikes.

Power-on-demand only 
Some e-bikes have an electric motor that operates on a power-on-demand basis only. In this case, the electric motor is engaged and operated manually using a throttle, which is usually on the handgrip just like the ones on a motorbike or scooter. These sorts of e-bikes often, but not always, have more powerful motors than pedelecs do.

With power-on-demand only e-bikes the rider can:
 ride by pedal power alone, i.e. fully human-powered.
 ride by electric motor alone by operating the throttle manually.
 ride using both together at the same time.

Some power-on-demand only e-bikes can hardly be confused with, let alone categorised as, bicycles. For example, the Noped is a term used by the Ministry of Transportation of Ontario for e-bikes which do not have pedals or in which the pedals have been removed from their motorised bicycle. These are better categorised as electric mopeds or electric motorcycles.

Legal status

(*) Allowed on bike paths when electric systems are turned off
(**) E-bikes are illegal in this region
(***) Some regions have special regulations, see corresponding entry under Electric bicycle laws.

Gallery

Popularity 
E-bike usage worldwide has experienced rapid growth since 1998.

China is the world's leading producer of e-bikes. According to the data of the China Bicycle Association, a government-chartered industry group, in 2004 China's manufacturers sold 7.5 million e-bikes nationwide, which was almost twice the year 2003 sales; domestic sales reached 10 million in 2005, and 16 to 18 million in 2006. In 2016, approximately 210 million electric bikes were used daily in China.

Most of their manufacturing and distribution plants are based in China.

According to trade umbrella body CONEBI, electric bike sales in the EU were over 5 million in 2021, up from 2 million e-bikes in 2016, up from 700,000 in 2010 and 200,000 in 2007. In 2019, the EU implemented a 79.3% protective tariff on imported Chinese e-bikes to protect EU producers.

Technical

Motors and drivetrains 
The two most common types of motors used in electric bicycles are brushed and brushless. Many configurations are available, varying in cost and complexity; direct-drive and geared motor units are both used. An electric power-assist system may be added to almost any pedal cycle using chain drive, belt drive, hub motors or friction drive. Brushless hub motors are the most common in modern designs. The motor is built into the wheel hub itself, while the stator is fixed solidly to the axle, and the magnets are attached to and rotating with the wheel. The bicycle wheel hub is the motor. The power levels of motors used are influenced by available legal categories and are often, but not always limited to under 750 watts.

Another type of electric assist motor, often referred to as the mid-drive system, is increasing in popularity. With this system, the electric motor is not built into the wheel but is usually mounted near (often under) the bottom bracket shell. In more typical configurations, a cog or wheel on the motor drives a belt or chain that engages with a pulley or sprocket fixed to one of the arms of the bicycle's crankset. Thus, the propulsion is provided at the pedals rather than at the wheel, being eventually applied to the wheel via the bicycle's standard drive train.

Because the power is applied through the chain and sprocket, power is typically limited to around 250–500 watts to protect against fast wear on the drivetrain. An electric mid-drive combined with an internal gear hub at the back hub may require care due to the lack of a clutch mechanism to soften the shock to the gears at the moment of re-engagement. A continuously variable transmission or a fully automatic internal gear hub may reduce the shocks due to the viscosity of oils used for liquid coupling instead of the mechanical couplings of the conventional internal gear hubs.

The main advantage mid-drive motors have over hub motors is that power is applied through the chain (or belt) and thus it utilizes the existing rear gears (either external or internal). This allows for the motor to operate more efficiently at a wider range of vehicle speeds. Without utilizing the bicycle's gears, equivalent hub motors tend to be less effective propelling the ebike slowly up steep hills and also propelling the ebike fast on the flat.

Batteries
E-bikes use rechargeable batteries in addition to electric motors and some form of control. Battery systems in use include sealed lead–acid (SLA), nickel–cadmium (NiCad), nickel–metal hydride (NiMH) or lithium-ion polymer (Li-ion). Batteries vary according to the voltage, total charge capacity (amp hours), weight, the number of charging cycles before performance degrades, and ability to handle over-voltage charging conditions. The energy costs of operating e-bikes are small, but there can be considerable battery replacement costs. The lifespan of a battery pack varies depending on the type of usage. Shallow discharge/recharge cycles will help extend the overall battery life.

Range is a key consideration with e-bikes, and is affected by factors such as motor efficiency, battery capacity, efficiency of the driving electronics, aerodynamics, hills and weight of the bike and rider. Some manufacturers, such as the Canadian BionX or American Vintage Electric Bikes, have the option of using regenerative braking, the motor acts as a generator to slow the bike down prior to the brake pads engaging. This is useful for extending the range and the life of brake pads and wheel rims. There are also experiments using fuel cells. e.g. the PHB.
Some experiments have also been undertaken with super capacitors to supplement or replace batteries for cars and some SUVS.
E-bikes developed in Switzerland in the late 1980s for the Tour de Sol solar vehicle race came with solar charging stations but these were later fixed on roofs and connected so as to feed into the electric mains. The bicycles were then charged from the mains, as is common today. While e-bike batteries were produced mainly by bigger companies in past, many small to medium companies have started using innovative new methods for creating more durable batteries. State of the art, custom built automated precision CNC spot welding machines created 18650 battery packs are commonly used among do-it-yourself e-bike makers.

Design variations

Not all e-bikes take the form of conventional push-bikes with an incorporated motor, such as the Cytronex bicycles which use a small battery disguised as a water bottle.
Some are designed to take the appearance of low capacity motorcycles, but smaller in size and consisting of an electric motor rather than a petrol engine. For example, the Sakura e-bike incorporates a 200 W motor found on standard e-bikes, but also includes plastic cladding, front and rear lights, and a speedometer. It is styled as a modern moped, and is often mistaken for one.

Converting a non-electric bicycle to its electric equivalent can be complicated but numerous 'replace a wheel' solutions are now available on the market.

An Electric Pusher Trailer is an e-bike design which incorporates a motor and battery into a trailer that pushes any bicycle. One such trailer is the two-wheeled Ridekick. Other, rarer designs include that of a 'chopper' styled e-bike, which are designed as more of a 'fun' or 'novelty' e-bike than as a purposeful mobility aid or mode of transport.

Electric cargo bikes allow the rider to carry large, heavy items which would be difficult to transport without electric power supplementing the human power input.

There are many e-bikes design variations available, some with batteries attached to the frame, some housed within the tube. Some use fat tires for improved stability and off-road capability.

Various designs (including those mentioned above) are designed to fit inside most area laws, and the ones that contain pedals can be used on roads in the United Kingdom, among other countries.

Folding e-bikes are also available.

Electric self-balancing unicycles do not conform to e-bike legislation in most countries and therefore cannot be used on the road, but may be legal to use on the sidewalk. They are the cheapest electric cycles and used by the last mile commuters, for urban use and to be combined with public transport, including buses. They are not legal for use on the public highway (including footways and cycle paths) in the United Kingdom.

Tricycles

Electric trikes have also been produced that conform to the e-bike legislation. These have the benefit of additional low speed stability and are often favored by people with disabilities. Cargo carrying tricycles are also gaining acceptance, with a small but growing number of couriers using them for package deliveries in city centres. Latest designs of these trikes resemble a cross-between a pedal cycle and a small van.

Health effects 
E-bike use was shown to increase the amount of physical activity. E-bike users in seven European cities had 10% higher weekly energy expenditure than other cyclists because they cycled longer trips.

E-bikes can also provide a source of exercise for individuals who have trouble exercising for an extended time (due to injury or excessive weight, for example) as the bike can allow the rider to take short breaks from pedaling and also provide confidence to the rider that they'll be able to complete the selected path without becoming too fatigued or without having forced their knee joints too hard (people who need to use their knee joints without wearing them out unnecessarily may in some electric bikes adjust the level of motor assistance according to the terrain). A University of Tennessee study provides evidence that energy expenditure (EE) and oxygen consumption (VO2) for e-bikes are 24% lower than that for conventional bicycles, and 64% lower than for walking. Further, the study notes that the difference between e-bikes and bicycles are most pronounced on the uphill segments.

There are individuals who claim to have lost considerable amounts of weight by using an electric bike. A recent prospective cohort study however found that people using e-bikes have a higher BMI than those using conventional bikes. By making the biking terrain less of an issue, people who would not otherwise consider biking can use the electric assistance when needed and otherwise pedal as they are able. 
E-bikes can be a useful part of cardiac rehabilitation programmes, since health professionals will often recommend a stationary bike be used in the early stages of these. Exercise-based cardiac rehabilitation programmes can reduce deaths in people with coronary heart disease by around 27%.

Road traffic safety
Schleinitz et al. (2014) concluded that e-bike users in Germany were no more likely than conventional cyclists to be involved in "safety-critical situations". However, Dozza et al. (2015) concluded (from an analysis of Swedish cyclists) that e-bikers may be involved in more critical incidents but with "lower severity". Additionally, e-bikers were less likely to have dangerous interactions with motorized vehicles.

Environmental effects
E-bikes are zero-emissions vehicles, as they emit no combustion by-products, but the environmental effects of electricity generation and power distribution and of manufacturing and recycling batteries must be accounted for. E-bikes emit similar pollutants per kilometer as buses, with emission rates several times lower than motorcycles and cars. Even with these issues considered, e-bikes have a significantly lower environmental impact than cars, and are generally seen as environmentally desirable in an urban environment.

A 2018 study in England found that e-bikes, if used to replace car travel, have the capability to "cut car carbon dioxide (CO2) emissions in England by up to 50% (about 30 million tonnes per year)".

It has been suggested that the greatest opportunities are in rural and sub-urban settings: city dwellers already have many low-carbon travel options, so the greatest impact would be on encouraging use outside urban areas. There may also be scope for e-bikes to help people who are most affected by rising transport costs.

The environmental effects involved in recharging the batteries can of course be reduced. The small size of the battery pack on an e-bike, relative to the larger pack used in an electric car, makes them very good candidates for charging via solar power or other renewable energy resources. Sanyo capitalized on this benefit when it set up "solar parking lots", in which e-bike riders can charge their vehicles while parked under photovoltaic panels.

The environmental credentials of e-bikes, and electric / human powered hybrids generally, have led some municipal authorities to use them, such as Little Rock, Arkansas, with their Wavecrest electric power-assisted bicycles or Cloverdale, California police with Zap e-bikes. China's e-bike manufacturers, such as Xinri, are now partnering with universities in a bid to improve their technology in line with international environmental standards, backed by the Chinese government who is keen to improve the export potential of the Chinese manufactured e-bikes.

Both land management regulators and mountain bike trail access advocates have argued for bans of electric bicycles on outdoor trails that are accessible to mountain bikes, citing potential safety hazards as well as the potential for electric bikes to damage trails. A study conducted by the International Mountain Bicycling Association, however, found that the physical impacts of low-powered pedal-assist electric mountain bikes may be similar to traditional mountain bikes.

A recent study on the environment impact of e-bikes vs other forms of transportation found that e-bikes are:
 18 times more energy efficient than an SUV
 13 times more energy efficient than a sedan
 6 times more energy efficient than rail transit
 Of about equal impact to the environment as a conventional bicycle.

There are strict shipping regulations for lithium-ion batteries, due to safety concerns. In this regard, lithium iron phosphate batteries are safer than lithium cobalt oxide batteries.

Experience by country

China
China has experienced an explosive growth of sales of non-assisted e-bikes including scooter type, with annual sales jumping from 56,000 units in 1998 to over 21 million in 2008, and reaching an estimated fleet of 120 million e-bikes in early 2010. This boom was triggered by Chinese local governments' efforts to restrict motorcycles in city centers to avoid traffic disruption and accidents. By late 2009 motorcycles are banned or restricted in over ninety major Chinese cities. Users began replacing traditional bicycles and motorcycles and e-bike became an alternative to commuting by car. Nevertheless, road safety concerns continue as around 2,500 e-bike related deaths were registered in 2007. By late 2009 ten cities had also banned or imposed restrictions on e-bikes on the same grounds as motorcycles. Among these cities were Guangzhou, Shenzhen, Changsha, Foshan, Changzhou, and Dongguang.

In April 2019, the China's regulatory policies change, new standards around electric bikes were introduced, governing things like a bicycle's weight, maximum speed and nominal voltage. Vehicles which apply the new standard, including international 25 km/h speed limit, are legally considered as bicycles and do not require registration. E-bikes out of this standard are considered as motorcycles subject to helmet and license regulation.

China is the world's leading manufacturer of e-bikes, with 22.2 million units produced in 2009. Some of the biggest manufacturers of E-bikes in the world are BYD and Geoby. Production is concentrated in five regions, Tianjin, Zhejiang, Jiangsu, Shandong, and Shanghai. China exported 370,000 e-bikes in 2009. In 2019, about 223,000 China companies were in businesses related to the electric-bike industry.

Netherlands
The Netherlands has a fleet of 18 million bicycles. E-bikes have reached a market share of 10% by 2009, as e-bikes sales quadrupled from 40,000 units to 153,000 between 2006 and 2009, and the electric-powered models represented 25% of the total bicycle sales revenue in that year. By early 2010 one in every eight bicycles sold in the country is electric-powered despite the fact that on average an e-bike is three times more expensive than a regular bicycle. E-bike sales have now overtaken those of unpowered bikes, reaching 423,000 in 2019 and 547,000 in 2020.

This survey also showed that e-bike ownership is particularly popular among people aged 65 and over, but limited among commuters. The e-bike is used in particular for recreational bicycle trips, shopping and errands.

United States
In 2009 the U.S. had an estimated fleet of 200,000 e-bikes. In 2012 they were increasingly favored in New York as food-delivery vehicles. The North American Electric Bike Market is expected to grow at a CAGR of 10.13% from 2021-2028.

India 
In India electric bicycles market was valued at USD 1.14 million in 2021, and is expected to reach USD 2.31 million by 2027, projecting a CAGR of 12.69% during this forecast period.

Use in warfare 

Ukraine is using e-bikes for the war against Russia. These donated bikes are used for snipers and anti-tank weapons. This echoes past usage of bicycle infantry in wartime, particularly by the Japanese forces.

See also
 
 Active travel
 Electric unicycle
 Electric vehicle conversion
 Eurobike
 Fatbike
 List of electric bicycle brands and manufacturers
 Low-speed vehicle
 Mountain bike
 Outline of cycling
 Renewable energy
  – electrically powered four-wheel carts used in the Netherlands
 Timeline of transportation technology
 Twike

References

External links

 
Electric
Cycle types
Bicycle
Micromobility
Road cycles
Vehicles introduced in 1897